Natalia Hissamutdinova (born 16 November 1983) is an Estonian breaststroke and medley swimmer. She is 37-time long course and 64-time short course Estonian swimming champion. She has broken 71 Estonian records in swimming.

References

1983 births
Living people
Estonian female breaststroke swimmers
Estonian female medley swimmers
Sportspeople from Kohtla-Järve
21st-century Estonian women